Chort is a demon in Slavic mythology. The word may also refer to:

 Jordan Chort, a French football player
 an alternative name for Theta Leonis, a star in the constellation Leo
 an alternative name for the Hortaya Borzaya, a dog breed
 a character in the science-fiction novel The Icarus Hunt by Timothy Zahn